Felix Dausend (born 1 November 1988) is a German former professional footballer who played as a forward.

Career
Dausend began his professional career with 1. FC Saarbrücken, for whom he signed in January 2012. He made his 3. Liga debut three months later, as a substitute for Lukas Kohler in a 3–2 win over Kickers Offenbach. After eighteen months with Saarbrücken, he signed for SV Elversberg, who had just been promoted to the 3. Liga. He was released by Elversberg in January 2014 and signed for Borussia Neunkirchen.

References

External links

1988 births
Living people
German footballers
Association football forwards
3. Liga players
1. FC Saarbrücken players
SV Elversberg players
Borussia Neunkirchen players
SV Röchling Völklingen players
Sportspeople from Saarbrücken